The Embassy of Norway in Ottawa was established in 1949.  The main task of the embassy is to promote Norwegian interests in Canada and further develop Norwegian-Canadian relations.  In addition to the embassy there are eleven Norwegian Honorary Consuls in different locations in Canada.

Visa applications 
Due to a representation agreement all visa applications for Norway in Canada are handled by the Embassy of Denmark in Ottawa.

History 
Norway's diplomatic representation in Canada was raised in 1942 to a legation, stationed in Montreal.  The first minister in Canada was Daniel Steen, who already had been General Consul in Montreal since 1934. In 1949 the embassy was moved to the Canadian capital of Ottawa and upgraded to an embassy, led by an ambassador.

References

External links 
 Official website

Norway
Ottawa
Canada–Norway relations